KLZL-LP (90.7 FM) is a radio station licensed to Ten Sleep, Wyoming, United States. The station is currently owned by Paint Rock Radio.

See also
List of community radio stations in the United States

References

External links
 

LZL-LP
Community radio stations in the United States
LZL-LP
Radio stations established in 2014
2014 establishments in Wyoming
Washakie County, Wyoming